Charles Robert Carner (born April 30, 1957) is an American TV and film director and writer. He is primarily known for directing numerous TV movies as well as the theatrical film Witless Protection. He is married to Debra Sharkey, with whom he has two children, Michael and Grace Noelle.

Filmography (as director)
A Killer Among Friends (1992 TV movie)
One Woman's Courage (1994 TV movie)
Vanishing Point (1997 TV movie remake)
The Fixer (1998 TV movie)
Who Killed Atlanta's Children? (2000 TV movie)
Christmas Rush (2002 TV movie)
Red Water (2003 TV movie)
Judas (2004 TV movie)
Witless Protection (2008 theatrical film)
JL Ranch (2016 theatrical film)
Lowell Park (TBA theatrical film)

Filmography (as screenwriter)
Seduced (1985 TV movie)
Gymkata (1985 theatrical film)
Let's Get Harry (1986 theatrical film)
Blind Fury (1989 theatrical film)
Eyes of a Witness (1991 TV movie)
A Killer Among Friends (1992 TV movie)
Vanishing Point (1997 TV movie remake)
The Fixer (1998 TV movie)
Who Killed Atlanta's Children? (2000 TV movie)
Crossfire Trail (2001 TV movie)
Christmas Rush (2002 TV movie)
Witless Protection (2008 theatrical film)
Lowell Park (TBA theatrical film)

References

External links

1957 births
American male film actors
Living people
American television directors
Writers from Chicago
Film directors from Illinois